Richard Louis Duckett (January 30, 1885 – July 19, 1972) was a Canadian athlete, lawyer and coroner, who held office in the judicial district of Montreal between 1937 and 1961.

Biography
Born in Montreal, the eldest son of a second-generation Irish Canadian shopkeeper and a French Canadian mother, Duckett was educated at the Collège Sainte-Marie before earning a law degree at the Université Laval à Montréal in 1908.

Representing Canada as a member of the Ottawa Nationals Lacrosse Club, Duckett won a gold medal at the 1908 Summer Olympics in London. In December 1909, he briefly joined the newly-formed Club Athlétique Canadien, but never played a game for the team and did not pursue an ice hockey career any further, though he remained an active lacrosse player through most of the 1910s.

After ending his athletic career, he joined a Montreal legal cabinet, before his appointment as coroner for the district of Montreal by the Duplessis administration in 1937, a position he occupied until his retirement in 1961.

Duckett died in Montreal in 1972, at age 87.

References

External links
Richard Louis Duckett's profile at Sports Reference.com
Profile on HockeyGods.com

1880s births
1972 deaths
Canadian coroners
Canadian lacrosse players
Lacrosse players at the 1908 Summer Olympics
Olympic lacrosse players of Canada
Olympic gold medalists for Canada
Ice hockey people from Montreal
Montreal Canadiens (NHA) players
Medalists at the 1908 Summer Olympics
Olympic medalists in lacrosse
20th-century Canadian lawyers